Gabriel Casseus (born April 28, 1972) is an American actor and screenwriter from Roosevelt, New York.

Biography
Casseus, born in New York City, is of Haitian descent.

Casseus was nominated for the 1995 Independent Spirit Award for Best Debut Performance in the film New Jersey Drive. He has appeared in the films Get on the Bus, Fallen, and Black Dog.

He had roles as pool-playing Freddie in the 50 Cent movie Before I Self Destruct (2009), as Elliot's cellmate in Bedazzled, and as Army Ranger Kurth in Black Hawk Down.

Casseus has appeared on television shows including Grey's Anatomy, CSI: Miami, CSI: NY, The Practice, Law & Order and 24.

He is a co-writer of the 2010 film Takers.

Filmography

References

Bibliography
 One Square Mile: The History of Roosevelt, NY from an Autobiographical Perspective. Sheldon Parrish.

External links
 

1972 births
Living people
American male television actors
Male actors from New York City
Writers from New York City
Haitian-American male actors
Screenwriters from New York (state)